Pyrianoreina is a genus of beetles in the family Cerambycidae, containing the following species:

 Pyrianoreina hovorei Martins & Galileo, 2008
 Pyrianoreina piranga Martins & Galileo, 2008

References

Acanthoderini